The Cherryvale Carnegie Free Library is a Carnegie library located at 329 E. Main in Cherryvale, Kansas. The library was built in 1913 through a $10,000 grant from the Carnegie Foundation. Architect George P. Washburn, who also designed eight other Carnegie libraries in Kansas, designed the library in the Classical Revival style. The red brick library has three bays in its facade. The library's recessed entrance is a classical pavilion with a brick frieze and supporting Tuscan columns and brick pillars; the doorway is topped with a limestone lintel. The low roof of the library is surrounded by a parapet.

The library was added to the National Register of Historic Places on August 18, 1987.

References

External links
 Cherryvale Public Library - official site

Libraries on the National Register of Historic Places in Kansas
Neoclassical architecture in Kansas
Library buildings completed in 1913
Buildings and structures in Montgomery County, Kansas
Carnegie libraries in Kansas
1913 establishments in Kansas
Public libraries in Kansas
Education in Montgomery County, Kansas
National Register of Historic Places in Montgomery County, Kansas